Arthur Lodge (7 April 1933 – 9 October 2022) was an Australian cricketer. He played fifteen first-class matches for Western Australia between 1958/59 and 1961/62.

In 1954 (aged 21), Lodge started playing baseball. A year later he was selected to play in the Claxton Shield in Sydney with the Western Australian state team.

Lodge attended Hale School from 1942 to 1952. He died in Perth on 9 October 2022.

References

External links
 

1933 births
Living people
Australian cricketers
Western Australia cricketers